Silsila Badalte Rishton Ka is an Indian romantic drama series which premiered on 4 June 2018 on Colors TV. It was produced by Sunjoy Waddhwa by Sphere Origins. The show focused on changing relationships, love triangles and extra marital affairs. In 2018, the story revolved around Kunal, Nandini and Mauli played by Shakti Arora, Drashti Dhami and Aditi Sharma. In 2018, the show moved to digital platform Voot and in 2019, took a generation leap, focusing on Mishti, Pari and Ruhaan played by Tejasswi Prakash, Aneri Vajani and Kunal Jaisingh.

The first season was about Kunal, Mauli and Nandini where Kunal and Nandini fall for each other while Mauli moves on in life with Ishaan after divorcing Kunal. It also focused on showing domestic violence against women by showcasing Nandini's husband, Rajdeep. The first season was first telecasted on Colors TV but later shifted to  Voot. while the second season which focused on modern age youth, love and relationships was fully on digital streaming platform Voot.

Series overview

Plot
Mauli Srivastav and Nandini Verma are best friends who grew up together. Nandini chooses Rajdeep Thakur over Mauli's friendship despite her of warning Nandini of his bad character which leads to a fallout between the two and they part ways.

7 years later

Mauli, who is now a gynaecologist is married to Kunal Malhotra who is a pediatrician. Married to Rajdeep, Nandini is a victim of domestic violence. An ambitious businessman and a dominating husband, Rajdeep often abuses Nandini, both physically and mentally.

Kunal sees Nandini at a medical conference and saves her from a major accident. He discovers she is the friend Mauli reminisces about. He discusses it with Mauli. She meets Nandini after seven years. Nandini informs Mauli of her pregnancy. Rajdeep beats Nandini upon hearing about her pregnancy and leaves her on a road. Kunal finds her and takes her to the hospital. Nandini miscarries.

With the support of Kunal, she gets Rajdeep arrested on domestic abuse charges and begins to live in Kunal's home. He starts falling for her; he reminds himself about Mauli but is unable to stop thinking about Nandini. Slowly, she begins to feel the same for Kunal and decides to leave town due to her inability to control her romantic feelings for him.

When Kunal learns this, he stops her and confesses his own feelings. Nandini and Kunal love each other secretly. Mauli is heartbroken upon knowing this and want to move out his house. Kunal's mother stops her from leaving and force Kunal to leave. Kunal accepts his mistake and gets out of house. Mauli files for a divorce. After Kunal and Mauli parted their ways, Kunal and Nandini planned to get married. Mauli finds out that she is pregnant. Kunal discovers this, but accuses her of false pregnancy after a misunderstanding. He marries Nandini and they move out while Mauli decides to get up by herself.

6 years later
Mauli lives with her daughter Mishti Malhotra and best friend Ishaan Khanna. Kunal returns from London with his and Nandini's daughter Pari. He is unaware that Mishti is his daughter. Mishti and Pari become best friends, unaware they are half-sisters. Kunal and Mauli come face to face. She learns that Nandini died due to cancer. She is deeply heartbroken and begins to take care of Pari as her own. 

Kunal discovers that Mishti is his daughter. However, Mishti also learns that Kunal is her father, and becomes bitter towards him and Pari. Mauli forgives Nandini. Ishaan proposes to her. Kunal loses his memory in an accident, only remembering Mauli. She stays with him. Kunal after having visions of past finally regains his memory and meets Pari. Later Mauli realizes her love for Ishaan and chooses him over Kunal. They both get married and they soon have a son name Ansh Khanna.

17 years later
Mishti, Pari and Ansh grow up. Mauli, Kunal and Ishaan are dead. Mishti is a perfectionist who believes in love and commitment, about to get engaged to her boyfriend, Veer. Pari is commitment phobic and easy going; her childhood friend Arnav loves her but she doesn't love him. Mishti and Pari run an event-management company.

Pari gets fascinated by Veer's friend, Ruhaan; who is attracted to Mishti. He develops a conflicting relation with Mishti and an easy going bond of friendship with Pari.

Mishti and Veer get engaged. Ruhaan tries to ignore his feelings for her. Mishti is nervous sensing how she feels around Ruhaan and tries to push away her love.

Pari starts falling for Ruhaan. Arnav is heartbroken. Eventually, Mishti accepts her feelings for Ruhaan. They confess their love to each other; she breaks up with Veer, who informs Pari about Mishti and Ruhaan's relationship hoping to cause problems between them. Upon knowing Pari's feelings for Ruhaan, Mishti decides to sacrifice her love.

She denies having feelings for Ruhaan by faking to get back with Veer. Pari proposes Ruhaan but is heartbroken when he rejects her. Ruhaan questions Mishti's sacrifice. She is adamant. later after many discussion mishti-veer and pari-ruhaan's marriage is fixed .on the wedding day, Mishti faints and is diagnosed with a lupus. Pari discovers Mishti and Ruhaan's love for each other, and  donates her kidney to save Mishti.

3 months later
Mishti and Ruhaan get married and move into a new house in same apartment. Mishti, Pari, Ruhaan, Ansh and Arnav celebrate together with Kunal's mother, Radhika.

Cast

Main
 Aditi Sharma as Dr. Mauli Srivastav Khanna – Gynaecologist; Jyoti's daughter; Mayank's sister; Nandini's childhood friend; Kunal's ex-wife; Ishaan's wife; Mishti and Ansh's mother (Dead) (2018–2019)
 Shakti Arora as Dr. Kunal Malhotra – Pediatrician; Radhika's son; Mauli's ex-husband; Nandini's husband; Mishti and Pari's father (Dead) (2018–2019)
 Drashti Dhami as Nandini Malhotra – Mauli's childhood friend; Rajdeep's ex-wife; Kunal's wife; Pari's mother (Dead) (2018)
 Kinshuk Mahajan as Ishaan Khanna – Sandhya's son; Mauli's husband; Mishti's adoptive father; Ansh's father (Dead) (2018-2019)
 Tejasswi Prakash as Mishti Malhotra Khanna – Mauli and Kunal's daughter; Ishaan's adoptive daughter; Pari and Ansh's half-sister; Ruhaan's wife (2019)
 Maisha Dixit as Child Mishti Malhotra Khanna (2018–2019) 
 Aneri Vajani as Pari Malhotra – Nandini and Kunal's daughter; Mishti's half-sister; Ansh's adoptive sister (2019)
 Arravya Sharma as Child Pari Malhotra (2018–2019)
 Kunal Jaisingh as Ruhaan – Veer's childhood friend; Mishti's husband (2019)

Recurring
 Jaya Bhattacharya as Radhika Malhotra – Kunal's mother; Mishti and Pari's grandmother; Ansh's adoptive grandmother; Sue's best friend (2018–2019)
 Abhinav Shukla as Rajdeep Thakur – Parvati's son; Nandini's ex-husband (2018)
 Rohan Gandotra as Veer Verma – Naina and Sushant's son; Ruhaan's childhood friend; Mishti's former fiancé (2019)
 Akshit Sukhija as Arnav – Sue's nephew; Taani's brother; Pari's childhood friend (2019)
 Dolly Minhas as Sukhmani aka Sue – Arnav and Taani's aunt; Radhika's best friend (2019)
 Siddharth Tamboli as Ansh Khanna – Mauli and Ishaan's son; Mishti's half-brother; Pari's adoptive brother; Taani's friend (2019)
 Evan Dixit as Baby Ansh Khanna (2019)
 Mishmee Das as Taani – Sue's niece; Arnav's sister; Ansh's friend (2019)
 Neena Cheema as Yamini Malhotra – Kunal's grandmother; Mishti and Pari's great-grandmother (2018–2019)
 Abigail Jain as Mehak – Kunal's friend; Pari's care-taker (2018)
 Prateeksha Lonkar as Sandhya Khanna – Ishaan's mother (2018–2019)
 Roma Bali as Jyoti Srivastav – Mauli and Mayank's mother (2018)
 Raj Singh Suryavanshi as Mayank Srivastav – Jyoti's son; Mauli's brother (2018)
 Bindiya Kalra as Naina Verma – Sushant's wife; Veer's mother (2019)
 Farukh Saeed as Sushant Verma – Naina's husband; Veer's father (2019)
 Prachi Thakker as Sweety Khanna – Malhotra family's neighbour; Ishaan's cousin (2018–2019)
 Arjun Aneja as Manas Ahuja – Mauli and Nandini's college friend (2018)
 Dalljiet Kaur as Amrita (cameo) (2018)

Guests
 Harshad Chopda as Aditya Hooda from Bepannah
 Jennifer Winget as Zoya Siddiqui from Bepannah
 Meera Deosthale as Chakor Rajvanshi from Udaan
 Ritvik Arora as Ahaan Dhanrajgir from Tu Aashiqui
 Jannat Zubair Rahmani as Pankti Sharma from Tu Aashiqui
 Shivin Narang as Jai Mittal from Internet Wala Love
 Tunisha Sharma as Aadhya Verma from Internet Wala Love
 Aalisha Panwar and Vineet Raina as Tara Raichand and Virat Raichand from Ishq Mein Marjawan
 Varun Dhawan, Alia Bhatt and Aditya Roy Kapur to promote their film Kalank
 Salman Khan to promote their upcoming film Bharat
 Shahid Kapoor and Kiara Advani to promote their upcoming film Kabir Singh

Production

Casting 
Initially, Devoleena Bhattacharjee was selected to play Nandini but the role went to Drashti Dhami. Similarly, Sukirti Kandpal was selected to play Dr Mauli but Aditi Sharma got the role. Likewise, although Aham Sharma was selected to play Rajdeep, Abhinav Shukla was later chosen.

Writing and development
The serial was named  'Bawre Nain'  but the makers changed the title to 'Silsila Badalte Rishton Ka'''.

Dhami stated that the serial is not about extra marital affairs but it focus on the friendship between two friends and two couples and how circumstances takes place in their lives.

Before the launch of the series, Manisha Sharma, programming head of Colors, stated that: 

Reception
Critical reception

Shweta Ksheri of India Today wrote, "Drashti Dhami nails it as the tormented wife; a good comeback for the actress." Soumyata Chauhan of DNA India wrote: "Shakti-Aditi's sizzling romance perfectly off-sets Drashti Dhami's abusive marriage." Shruti Shiksha of NDTV wrote: "The show is a good take on new-age friendship, love and marriage". The Times of India stated, "Silsila Badalte Rishton'' Ka has managed to grab the attention of the viewers for its unique storyline and bold content".

Controversy
 
In the beginning, the makers and Drashti Dhami told that the series is not about extra marital affairs but how circumstances takes place in couples lives and channel programming head of Colors stated that the serial is about exploring an evolved and modern love story.

In September 2018, some audiences were not happy about the storyline and blames the makers and main cast for showing extra marital affairs content on national television.

They started to troll on the main cast of the series on social networking sites.

References

External links
 Official website
 

Indian television soap operas
Hindi serials focus on violence against women
Colors TV original programming
2018 Indian television series debuts
Indian drama television series